The British Ordnance BL 12 inch howitzer on truck, railway, a type of railway gun, was developed following the success of the 9.2-inch siege howitzer. It was similar but unrelated to the 12-inch siege howitzers Mk II and IV.

Design and development

Mark I
Mk I was introduced from March 1916. It is identified by its short barrel and recuperator above the barrel.

Mark III

The longer-barrelled Mk III soon followed, with a heavier breech to balance the gun. It retained the recuperator above the barrel.

Mark V

Mk V, dating from July 1917, moved the recoil buffer and recuperator into a single housing below the barrel, which was common for all new British artillery developed during World War I. It also had a lighter breech with the gun balanced by the redesigned recoil system and altered gun positioning on the cradle. Mk V also relocated the loading platform from the railway wagon to the revolving gun mounting, which now allowed 120° of traverse, and by overhanging the opposite side provided crew access when the gun fired to the side (90° traverse) and also helped to balance it.

Combat service

All 3 versions served on the Western Front in World War I, usually in 2-gun batteries, operated by the Royal Garrison Artillery.

Mk III and MK V were deployed for the home defence of Great Britain in World War II.

Ammunition

See also 
List of railway artillery

Notes

References

Bibliography
 Dale Clarke, British Artillery 1914-1919. Heavy Artillery. Osprey Publishing, Oxford UK, 2005 
 I.V. Hogg & L.F. Thurston, British Artillery Weapons & Ammunition 1914–1918. London: Ian Allan, 1972.

Further reading
 Harry W Miller, United States Army Ordnance Department, Railway Artillery: A Report on the Characteristics, Scope of Utility, Etc., of Railway Artillery, Volume II, Pages 136-145. Washington : Government Print Office, 1921

External links

Newsreel showing 12" Mk I railway howitzer and other heavy weapons in action

World War II railway artillery of the United Kingdom
World War I railway artillery of the United Kingdom
World War I howitzers
305 mm artillery
Elswick Ordnance Company